is a former Japanese football player.

Club statistics

References

External links

tochigisc.com

1988 births
Living people
Association football people from Okayama Prefecture
Japanese footballers
J1 League players
J2 League players
J3 League players
Japan Football League players
Kyoto Sanga FC players
Tochigi SC players
Tochigi City FC players
SC Sagamihara players
Association football defenders